Ruslan Damirovich Valiullin (born 9 September 1994) is a Kazakhstani footballer who plays as a midfielder, most recently for Tobol and the Kazakhstan national team.

International career
Valiullin made his international debut for Kazakhstan on 28 March 2021 in a 2022 FIFA World Cup qualification match against France.

Following scoring two goals in Kazakhstan's 2-2 draw at home to Ukraine in the 2022 FIFA World Cup qualifier on 1 September 2021, Valiullin was informed that he had failed a drugs test after his club, Tobol, played against MŠK Žilina in the UEFA Europa Conference League on 12 August 2021.

Career statistics

International

International goals
Scores and results list Kazakhstan's goal tally first.

References

External links
 
 

1994 births
Living people
People from Oral, Kazakhstan
Kazakhstani footballers
Kazakhstan under-21 international footballers
Kazakhstan international footballers
Association football midfielders
FC Akzhayik players
FC Aktobe players
FC Tobol players
Kazakhstan Premier League players
Kazakhstan First Division players